Interzone is a British fantasy and science fiction magazine. Published since 1982, Interzone is the eighth-longest-running English language science fiction magazine in history, and the longest-running British science fiction (SF) magazine. Stories published in Interzone have been finalists for the Hugo Awards and have won a Nebula Award and numerous British Science Fiction Awards.

History
Interzone was initially produced by an unpaid collective of eight peopleJohn Clute, Alan Dorey, Malcolm Edwards, Colin Greenland, Graham James, Roz Kaveney, Simon Ounsley and David Pringle. According to Dorey, the group had been fans of the science fiction magazine New Worlds and wanted to create a "New Worlds for the 1980s, something that would publish only great fiction and be a proper outlet for new writers."

While the magazine started as an editorial collective, soon editor David Pringle was the driving force behind Interzone. In 1984 Interzone received a generous donation from Sir Clive Sinclair; the magazine later received support from the Arts Council of Great Britain, Yorkshire Arts, and the Greater London Arts Association.

Interzone was first initially published quarterly, from Spring 1982 to Issue 24, Summer 1988. It was then on a bi-monthly schedule from September/October 1988 to Issue 34, March/April 1990. For over a decade, it was then published monthly until several slippages of schedule reduced it to an effectively bi-monthly magazine in 2003.

Founding editor David Pringle stepped down in early 2004 with issue 193. It was taken over by Andy Cox, who had founded TTA Press to publish his magazine The Third Alternative, which was subsequently renamed Black Static and published alongside Interzone. Under TTA Press, the magazine underwent a series of redesigns, notably switching from A4 to a compact perfect bound format in 2012. Gardner Dozois referred to Interzone in 2007 as the "handsomest SF magazine in the business".

In 2006, the Science Fiction Writers of America removed the magazine from its list of professional markets due to low rates and small circulation. However, within the genre field the magazine is still ranked as a professional publication. As Dozois has stated, "By the definition of SFWA, Interzone doesn't really qualify as a 'professional magazine' because of its low rates and circulation, but as it's thoroughly professional in the caliber of writers that it attracts and in the quality of the fiction it produces, just about everyone considers it to be a professional magazine anyway." It pays semi-professional rates to writers.

In January 2021, after announcing a delay of issue 290 "for various reasons (some covid-related, some not)", Andy Cox announced that he was stepping down as editor of Interzone, and selling the title to PS Publishing, who planned a quarterly digital-only title edited by Ian Whates. However, the deal was later cancelled, with Andy Cox saying he was unhappy that existing subscriptions would not be honoured. 

A "double issue" numbered 290/291 was published in June 2021, followed by 292/293 in July 2022, which was announced as the 100th and last to be published by TTA Press. From issue 294 onwards, the magazine will be edited by Gareth Jelley, and published by his MYY Press, aiming to restore the bimonthly schedule. An accompanying online magazine, interzone.digital, was launched at the same time as the official announcement.

Awards and recognition
Interzone has been nominated 25 consecutive times for the Hugo Award for best semiprozine, winning the award in 1995. In 2005 the Worldcon committee gave David Pringle a Special Award for his work on the magazine. The magazine has also won the British Fantasy Award.

Each year, multiple stories published in Interzone are reprinted in the annual "year's best stories" anthologies, while other stories have been finalists for the Hugo and Nebula Awards. In 2010 the magazine became one of only eleven magazines to have a story win a Nebula Award. The winning story was the novelette "Sinner, Baker, Fabulist, Priest; Red Mask, Black Mask, Gentleman, Beast" by Eugie Foster. In addition, 16 stories originally published in Interzone have won the British Science Fiction Award for short fiction.

Interzone is the eighth longest-running English language science fiction magazine in history and the longest-running British SF magazine.

Writers 

Interzone has been responsible for starting the careers of a number of important
science fiction writers, including Stephen Baxter, Greg Egan, Kim Newman, Alastair Reynolds and Charles Stross, as well as publishing works by established writers such as Brian Aldiss, J. G. Ballard, Iain M. Banks, Thomas M. Disch, William Gibson, Robert Holdstock, Gwyneth Jones, Terry Pratchett, Christopher Priest, John Sladek, Brian Stableford, Ian Watson and many others. Interzone is also known for publishing new and upcoming writers, regularly publishing the works of Tim Lees, Aliette de Bodard, Gareth L. Powell, Eugie Foster, Jason Sanford, Val Nolan, Nina Allan, and others.

Interzone features regular columns by David Langford (Ansible Link– News & Gossip, Obituaries), Tony Lee (Laser Fodder – DVD Reviews) and Nick Lowe (Mutant Popcorn – Film Reviews). In 2010, Lowe won a British Science Fiction Award for his Mutant Popcorn column.

In 2008 a Mundane SF issue was published, guest edited by Geoff Ryman, Julian Todd and Trent Walters.

Leeds-based artist Pete Lyon contributed many illustrations in the 1980s.  He was nominated for the British SF Association Awards in 1987 for his cover work on the first Interzone magazine.

Anthologies 
In the first years, several anthologies were published.

 John Clute, Colin Greenland and David Pringle: Interzone – The 1st Anthology, Everyman Fiction Limited, 1985
 John Clute, David Pringle and Simon Ounsley: Interzone – The 2nd Anthology, Simon & Schuster Limited, 1987
 John Clute, David Pringle and Simon Ounsley: Interzone – The 3rd Anthology, Simon & Schuster Limited, 1988
 John Clute, David Pringle and Simon Ounsley: Interzone – The 4th Anthology, Simon & Schuster Limited, 1989
 John Clute, David Pringle and Simon Ounsley: Interzone – The 5th Anthology, New English Library Paperbacks, 1991
 David Pringle: The Best of Interzone, Voyager, 1996

The second through fourth anthologies were reissued by New English Library.

Footnotes

External links
 Interzone
 Index of Interzone
 Interzone Reviews at Upcoming4.me

1982 establishments in the United Kingdom
Bi-monthly magazines published in the United Kingdom
Hugo Award-winning works
Magazines established in 1982
Science fiction magazines established in the 1980s
Science fiction magazines published in the United Kingdom
Magazines published in London
Mass media in Leeds